Ernest George Pretyman,  (13 November 1859 – 26 November 1931), known as E. G. Pretyman, was a British soldier and Conservative Party politician.

Background and education
Born on 13 November 1859 and christened on 1 January 1860 at Great Carlton, Lincolnshire, Pretyman was the son of Reverend Frederic Pretyman, Canon of Lincoln. He was the great-grandson of George Pretyman Tomline, a prominent late 18th century cleric, as well as the heir of "Colonel" George Tomline, his father's first cousin. He was educated at Eton and at the Royal Military Academy, Woolwich. He entered the Royal Artillery in 1880 and retired in 1889.

Political career
Pretyman served as Member of Parliament (MP) for Woodbridge, Suffolk from 1895 to 1906 and for Chelmsford from 1908 to 1923. He was Civil Lord of the Admiralty from 1900 to 1903, Parliamentary and Financial Secretary to the Admiralty from 1903 to 1906, Parliamentary Secretary to the Board of Trade from 1915 to 1916 and Civil Lord of the Admiralty again from 1916 to 1919. He was appointed a Privy Counsellor in 1917.

E. G. Pretyman made a Gramophone Company recording of an address "On the Navy" in 1908.

Family
Pretyman married Lady Beatrice Adine Bridgeman (2 December 1870 – 27 June 1952), daughter of George Bridgeman, 4th Earl of Bradford, on 28 June 1894. They had three sons and three daughters. His most notable descendant today is Robert Gascoyne-Cecil, 7th Marquess of Salisbury, sometime Tory leader of the House of Lords in the 1990s.

Maj. George Marcus Tomline Pretyman, of Orwell Park, Suffolk, (24 April 1895 – 1979); his only child Gillian (who married Mark Bence-Jones) inherited the family papers.
Lt. Cmdr. Herbert Ernest Pretyman, R.N., of Newbury, Berkshire (19 June 1900 – 1987); twice married, with children by both marriages
Sir Walter Frederic Pretyman, of Campos, Brazil (17 October 1901 – 1987), who emigrated to Brazil 1924, and was appointed KBE 1967.  His second wife Vera de Sa Sottomaior was former wife of Randal Plunkett, 19th Lord Dunsany and mother of the 20th Lord Dunsany.  Sir Walter Pretyman was twice married, and had children by both marriages.
Ida Beatrice Pretyman (5 April 1896 – 1977) who married Captain Charles Wilfrid Lindley Meynell, a grandson of Charles Wood, 1st Viscount Halifax, and left children.
Marjorie Elizabeth Pretyman (1 May 1897 – 6 May 1969) who married Capt. Hon. Valentine Maurice Wyndham-Quin, R.N., of Chieveley, Berkshire.  They were parents of three daughters, including Marjorie "Mollie" Wyndham-Quin, widow of the 6th Marquess of Salisbury and mother of the present Marquess, formerly styled Viscount Cranbourne, sometime Tory leader of the House of Lords in the 1990s.  Another grandson is the biographer Max Egremont.
Katharine Louise Pretyman (1907– ?), who married Lt. Col. Charles Algernon Peel and left children.

Notes

External links 
 

1859 births
1931 deaths
Graduates of the Royal Military Academy, Woolwich
Royal Artillery officers
Conservative Party (UK) MPs for English constituencies
Legion of Frontiersmen members
Lords of the Admiralty
Members of the Privy Council of the United Kingdom
English justices of the peace
Deputy Lieutenants of Lincolnshire
People educated at Eton College
UK MPs 1895–1900
UK MPs 1900–1906
UK MPs 1906–1910
UK MPs 1910
UK MPs 1910–1918
UK MPs 1918–1922
UK MPs 1922–1923
Parliamentary Secretaries to the Board of Trade